The Community Radio Fund of Canada/le Fonds canadien de la radio communautaire is a Canadian not-for-profit organization that funds non-commercial community and campus radio stations and projects. The CRFC was founded in November 2007 by Canada's three largest associations of community radio stations: the National Campus and Community Radio Association, the Alliance des radios communautaires du Canada, and the Association des radiodiffuseurs communautaires du Québec.

Community radio organizations
Radio organizations in Canada
Community radio in Canada